Hollie Palmer (born 1 March 2001) is an Australian women's footballer who plays as a midfielder for Australian W-League club Brisbane Roar. She has previously played for Melbourne City.

Club career

Brisbane Roar
In October 2017 at the age of 16, Palmer played her first W-League game for Brisbane Roar on debut. She came on the field as a substitute for Allira Toby against Sydney FC which resulted in a 3–1 win.

In the upcoming December 2018, there were six potential contenders for the NAB Young Footballer of the Month in the W-League for November. Later, she was not claimed for the NAB Young Footballer of the Month as Ellie Carpenter won the award.

Melbourne City
In November 2020, Palmer joined Melbourne City.

Return to Brisbane Roar
After a season in Melbourne, Palmer returned to Brisbane Roar as part of coach Garrath McPherson's tactic of signing homegrown players.

International career
In April 2019, Hollie Palmer was named in the Young Matildas 23-player squad for the 2019 AFC U-19 Women's Championship. She played four games in the tournament.

References

External links
 Hollie Palmer at Soccerway
 Brisbane Roar Profile

2001 births
Living people
Australian women's soccer players
Brisbane Roar FC (A-League Women) players
Melbourne City FC (A-League Women) players
Women's association football midfielders
A-League Women players